The pyramid of Ahmose was built not as a tomb, but a cenotaph for pharaoh Ahmose I at the necropolis of Abydos, Egypt. It was the only royal pyramid built in this area. Today only a pile of rubble remains, reaching a height of about 10 m.

The pyramid was first examined by Arthur Mace and Charles Trick Currelly in 1899. In 1993 Stephen P. Harvey conducted intensive excavations on the area surrounding the pyramid.

The pyramid was constructed from sand and rubble and only the usual limestone casing kept the building in shape. The inclination of the sides was 60°.

It did not feature any chambers for burial. Around the pyramid were a number of temples and also a small cenotaph pyramid for Ahmose's grandmother Tetisheri.

See also 
 List of Egyptian pyramids
 Egyptian pyramid construction techniques

References

External links

Stephen Harvey Abydos

Pyramids of the Eighteenth Dynasty of Egypt
Abydos, Egypt sites
Ahmose I